Jimmy Powell Oval is a cricket ground in West Bay, Grand Cayman, near the city of George Town. 

The ground is named after Jimmy Powell (born 1940), a former president of the Cayman Islands Cricket Association. In April 2022, the ground was the venue for the first Twenty20 International (T20I) matches to be held in the Cayman Islands, when the Cayman Islands team hosted a series against Bahamas. These were the first official T20I matches to be played in the Cayman Islands since the International Cricket Council (ICC) granted full T20I status to all competitive matches between its members from 1 January 2019.

References

External links 
 cricHQ

Cricket grounds in the Cayman Islands
Sports venues in the Cayman Islands